The Miss Oklahoma World competition is a beauty pageant that selects the representative for Oklahoma in the Miss World America pageant.

The current Miss Oklahoma World is Priscilla Wang of Oklahoma City.

Winners 
Color key

Notes to table

References

Oklahoma culture
Women in Oklahoma
1951 establishments in Oklahoma
Recurring events established in 1951